The Blue Sickness, released by Tonic records in 2000, is Bocephus King's third album.  Described within the lyrics as "Goodnight forever to the two album curse", although fans will disagree that "It started out bad and it only got worse".  The album is a mixed landscape of sounds that spreads out as a kind of musical soundtrack to life.
"The blue sickness is a theme I came up with. It initially started when I was trying to describe taking too much codeine.

Then I started to think of the blue sickness as more of a mind frame for people in our age group, where you sort of don't want to go back. you don't want to go forward, it's like everyone's on this one constant nasty middle ground. The blue sickness went on to describe that whole position of sort of being stuck in the middle."

Within the liner notes of the CD there are two quotes that prepare you for the journey King has created.  Before taking the trip you are warned Hustlers of the world, there is one mark you cannot beat: the mark inside."  William S. Burroughs

For some, knowledge has made existence a godless purgatory-a savage middle ground, an incurable disease, a blue sickness."  Rev. Theolopolous Jones

References

2000 albums
Bocephus King albums